Zhaoqing, alternately romanized as Shiuhing, is a prefecture-level city in Guangdong Province, China. As of the 2020 census, its population was 4,113,594, with 1,553,109 living in the built-up (or metro) area made of Duanzhou, Dinghu and Gaoyao. The prefectural seat—except the Seven Star Crags—is fairly flat, but thickly forested mountains lie just outside its limits. Numerous rice paddies and aquaculture ponds are found on the outskirts of the city. Sihui and the southern districts of the prefecture are considered part of the Pearl River Delta.

Formerly one of the most important cities in southern China, Zhaoqing lost its importance during the Qing dynasty and is now primarily known for tourism and as a provincial "college town". Residents from Guangzhou, Shenzhen, and the other cities of the Pearl River Delta often visit it for weekend excursions. It is also a growing manufacturing center.

Name
Zhaoqing was known to the Qin and Han as Gaoyao (高要). It was renamed Duanzhou (端州) from its role as the seat of Duan Prefecture under the Sui. The present name, meaning "Beginning Auspiciousness", was bestowed on the area by Emperor Huizong of the Song in 1118. "Zhaoqing" is the pinyin romanization; the earlier Postal Map form "Shiuhing" derives from the name's Cantonese pronunciation.

History

Gaoyao was located on the south bank of the Xi River, named for its district's principal feature: the river's Lingyang Gorge (then known as "Gaoyao"). In the late 6th and early 7th centuries, the administration was relocated to Duanzhou on the opposite bank of the river, which became an important administrative and military center of the southern Sui Empire.

The  was built in Duanzhou during the reign of Emperor Renzong of Song (1022-1063).

When the Portuguese arrived in the 16th century, Zhaoqing was still an important center, serving as the seat of the Viceroy of Liangguang (Guangdong and Guangxi). Matteo Ricci's On the Christian Expedition among the Sinae tells of the early visits of Macanese-based Europeans to Zhaoqing. The Viceroy Chen Rui summoned Macao's mayor and bishop in the early 1580s, but the town sent its auditor Mattia Penella and the Italian Jesuit Michele Ruggieri in their place in 1582. After several false starts, Ruggieri and Matteo Ricci were allowed to establish their residence in the city, the first Jesuit mission house on mainland China, after Zhaoqing's governor Wang Pan learned of Ricci's skill as a mathematician and cartographer. Ricci drew the first modern Chinese map of the world in Zhaoqing in 1584. Ruggieri left for Rome in 1588 but Ricci remained until the next year, when a new viceroy expelled him from the city and obliged the Jesuits to relocate to Shaozhou (now Shaoguan).

During the Fall of the Ming in the mid-17th century, Zhaoqing served as the capital of the Prince of Gui's Southern Ming resistance, with the prince styling himself the Yongli Emperor. The town fell in 1650 and the prince relocated to Guilin and then various locations in Guangxi, Yunnan, and Burma. The Jesuits Andreas Wolfgang Koffler and, later, Michał Boym stayed for some time at his court.

The Qing viceroy of Liangguang relocated to Guangzhou but Zhaoqing remained a commandery seat, overseeing the counties of Gaoyao, Guangning, Deqing, Sihui, and Kaijian and Fengchuan (since combined into Fengkai); Gaoming (now part of Foshan); Xinxing (now part of Yunfu); Heshan, Kaiping, and Enping (now part of Jiangmen); and Yangchun and Yangjiang (now part of Yangjiang's separate prefecture).

Geography
It lies on the north shores of the Xi River, which flows from west to east, and opposite of Gaoyao. A plain area lies to the south and west of Zhaoqing, with mountains to the east and north.

Climate
The city has a monsoon-influenced humid subtropical climate (Köppen climate classification Cfa).

Administration
Zhaoqing has jurisdiction over 3 districts, 4 counties and 1 County-level city:

Economy
Located in the Pearl River Delta, Zhaoqing is one of the 9 prefecture-level cities in the Pearl River Delta Economic Zone (include Zhaoqing urban area, Dinghu, Gaoyao and Sihui only).

Primary industries

The rich local resources within the mountainous regions include coal, limestone, copper, lead, zinc, granite, gold, sulfur, gypsum and other minerals.

In the agriculture sector, the fertile plains yield paddy rice, sugar cane, aquatic products, fruits, rosin and cassia bark. Horticulture and farming contribute greatly to the local economy. The industries of Poultry farming and animal husbandry are also seeking to modernize their technology and management.

The forests in the mountainous regions of the city provide a rich source for herbal medicines and other materials like rosin and casia bark that are harvested from various forest plants.

Secondary industries
Food and beverages, building materials, electronics, micro bioengineering, chemicals, equipment and machinery, textile and garments are the pillar industries. Duanzhou, Gaoyao and Sihui area being developed as the export-oriented industrial bases. Yunfu is a major area for the production of sulfur and iron.

To facilitate industrial development in Zhaoqing, the local government has made great efforts in establishing various industrial zones / parks in the city. Dawang is facilitated as an export processing and trade zone.

Education
The city government of Zhaoqing is currently seeking to improve its higher education system and preserve cultural resources. Zhaoqing has a university and is also home to a campus of Guangdong University of Finance. There is also Zhaoqing Foreign Language College, a Canadian-American School and numerous other schools including those specializing in foreign language study.

Colleges and universities
 Zhaoqing University
 Zhaoqing Foreign Language College
    Guangdong College of Business and Technology
    Zhaoqing Financial University

Transportation

Zhaoqing is served by railways and highways. Direct train and bus services connect it to Guangzhou, Hong Kong and other cities in Guangdong. Major roadways include Interstates 321 and 324 and the Guang-Zhao and Guang-Wu Expressways. The Sanmao Railway also runs through Zhaoqing.  It is connected with Hong Kong via the KCRC Guangdong Through Train service from Zhaoqing railway station. Hong Kong owned and based Chu Kong Passenger Transport Co., Ltd also runs daily express catamaran ferries between Zhaoqing and Hong Kong.

Within the city, the primary form of public transportation is the 32 public bus routes and 2 sightseeing routes.

Sports

The 15th Games of Guangdong Province 
Zhaoqing was the hosting city of the 15th Games of Guangdong Province on August 8, 2018.

Marathon 
Zhaoqing has held 3 marathons since 2016. The first two year consisted only half-marathon. In 2018, the event for the first time consisted both full marathon and half marathon. In 2019, Zhaoqing will hold the 4th Zhaoqing International Marathon estimably in Q2.

High diving 
In 2018, the Zhaoqing Yingxiong High Diving Training Center, which contains the first year-round regulation-size high diving platform, opened at the Zhaoqing Sports Center. This venue would go on to host the FINA High Diving World Cup 2019.

Notes

References

Citations

Sources 

 , reprinted 2000.

External links 

 Zhaoqing Government website
Zhaoqing University website (in Chinese and English)
Zhaoqing Foreign Language College website
Guangdong University of Finance website (in Chinese and English)
News Guangdong Zhaoqing page
The Zhaoqing Ricci center
Matteo Ricci and his contributions to science in China
 Map of the city center
 Chu Kong Passenger Transport Co. Ltd.

 
Prefecture-level divisions of Guangdong